David Kingdon (born April 1969) is a Welsh international lawn bowler and former British champion.

Bowls career
He is twice winner of the Welsh National Bowls Championships singles in 2013 and 2016. After the 2013 victory he subsequently won the singles at the British Isles Bowls Championships in 2014. His father Brian Kingdon won the 1993 and 1997 triples national championship.

References

1969 births
Living people
Welsh male bowls players